"DJ Waley Babu" is a Punjabi-Hindi hip-hop single by Badshah featuring Aastha Gill, released by Sony Music India on 16 July 2015.

Background 

The song is sung by Badshah and Aastha Gill. It is the first single from Badshah's album the ONE (Original Never Ends). The song was released on 17 July 2015 by Sony Music India via YouTube and other music streaming services.

Reception 

The song was extremely popular at the time of the launch and gave both singers recognition in the Bollywood industry. As of 26 Mar 2020, the song's music video has over 270 million views on YouTube.

References

External links 
 

2015 songs
Punjabi-language songs